Official Bootleg: Snowball of Doom 2 is a double album released by Racer X. It is the band's fourth live album, and was recorded in Japan.  It was initially released alongside Getting Heavier.


Track listing

Disc one
"Superheroes"
"Phallic Tractor"
"Fire Of Rock"
"The Executioner's Song"
"King of the Monsters"
"Dead Man's Shoes"
"Sunlit Nights"
"Into the Night"
"Y.R.O. (and guitar solo)"
"Let the spirit Fly"
"Waiting"

Disc two
"Hammer Away"
"Bass Solo" (John Alderete)
"Miss Mistreater"
"That Hormone Thing"
"Scarified"
"Drum Solo" (Scott Travis)
"Motor Man"

Personnel
Jeff Martin - vocals
Paul Gilbert - guitar
John Alderete - bass guitar
Scott Travis - drums

External links
 Official Racer X website

Racer X (band) albums
2002 live albums